St. Fidelis College, Lucknow, India, is a co-educational Catholic (Christian) school established in 1977 and located in the Vikas Nagar/Aliganj area of Lucknow. School Affiliates include the Indian Certificate of Secondary Education (ICSE) and Indian School Certificate (ISC) boards. The name of the school is taken from the name of a saint Fidelis of Sigmaringen who is the patron of this college. In his honour, the school celebrates patron's day each year on 24th of April. The school added 10th and 11th-grade classes in 1993 and 1994, respectively. The college offers Maths, Biology and Commerce streams in the ISC section (11th-12th). From Kindergarten to 12th grade, the medium of instruction is English, while Hindi is a compulsory subject until the 10th grade.

Subjects
Subjects include English Language and Literature, Hindi Language and Literature, Social Science, Sanskrit, History, Civics, Geography, Mathematics, Physics, Chemistry, Biology, Physical Training (PT), Socially Useful Productive Work (SUPW), Singing, Computer Science, Art, Commerce, Accountancy, and Economics. Sanskrit is taught from the 5th grade to the 8th grade, and History till the 10th grade.

See also
List of schools in India

References and sources

External links
St. Fidelis page on PlanetVidyaSchools
school album on Picasaweb

Catholic secondary schools in India
Primary schools in Uttar Pradesh
High schools and secondary schools in Uttar Pradesh
Christian schools in Uttar Pradesh
Private schools in Lucknow
Educational institutions established in 1977
1977 establishments in Uttar Pradesh